The Maritime & Seafood Industry Museum (MSIM) was established in 1986 to preserve and interpret the maritime history and heritage of Biloxi and the Mississippi Gulf Coast. It accomplishes this mission through an array of exhibits on shrimping, oystering, recreational fishing, wetlands, managing marine resources, charter boats, marine blacksmithing, wooden boat building, net-making, catboats/Biloxi skiff, shrimp peeling machine and numerous historic photographs and objects. The Wade Guice Hurricane Museum within the museum, featuring  of exhibit space and a state of the art theatre. The Museum has brought life to local maritime history and heritage by replicating two 65-ft two-masted Biloxi Schooners.

In August 2005, the Museum was destroyed by Hurricane Katrina. Nine years later, a newly constructed museum opened to the public.

Programs 

The Maritime & Seafood Industry Museum currently sponsors two programs annually, The Sea and Sail Adventure Camp and the Billy Creel Memorial Wooden Boat Show.

In the Sea and Sail Adventure Camp, children aged 8–13 are given experience of the history and heritage of the Mississippi Gulf Coast through sailing trips, fishing, maritime crafts, and seafood industry field trips.

The Billy Creel Memorial Wooden Boat Show presents the historic, antique, classic and contemporary wooden boats at the largest gathering of watercraft on the Mississippi Gulf Coast.

Schooners 

The Maritime & Seafood Industry Museum has recaptured a piece of history in their two famous schooner, the "Glenn L. Swetman" and the "Mike Sekul". For a truly unique way of enjoying the Mississippi Gulf Coast. Step on board an authentic replica of a Biloxi oyster schooner. These "White Winged Queens" once sailed the Coast from the late 1800s to the early 1900s; however the introduction of marine engines and the changes in oyster harvesting laws caused these beautiful crafts to disappear.

Schooner Pier Complex 

Completed in June 2006, the Schooner Pier Complex provides a home for the two Biloxi Schooner replicas, Glenn L. Swetman and Mike Sekul. The pier has three pavilions, storage area for schooner parts, handicapped accessible rest room facilities and a second story observation deck. It also has a marine pump out station and an area for a future gift shop and office area for schooner business.

Reconstruction 
On August 2, 2014, a new three-story museum, containing , opened to the public.

See also 
 List of maritime museums in the United States

References

External links
Maritime & Seafood Industry Museum - official site

Museums established in 1986
Buildings and structures in Biloxi, Mississippi
History of Mississippi
Maritime museums in Mississippi
Food museums in the United States
Museums in Harrison County, Mississippi
1986 establishments in Mississippi